In 4th-century Christianity, the Anomoeans , and known also as Heterousians , Aetians , or Eunomians , were a sect that upheld an extreme form of Arianism, that Jesus Christ was not of the same nature (consubstantial) as God the Father nor was of like nature (homoiousian), as maintained by the semi-Arians.

In the 4th century, during the reign of Constantius II, this was the name by which the followers of Aëtius and Eunomius were described.

The semi-Arians condemned the Anomoeans in the Council of Seleucia, and the Anomoeans condemned the semi-Arians in their turn in the Councils of Constantinople and Antioch; erasing the word  (omoios) from the formula of Rimini and that of Constantinople and protesting that the Word had not only a different substance but also a will different from that of the Father. From that, they were to be called   (anomoioi).

In the 5th century, the Anomoean presbyter Philostorgius wrote an Anomoean church history.

Notable Anomoeans

Aëtius, who founded the Anomoean tradition, later bishop (361–?).
Theodulus, bishop of Chaeretapa (?–c. 363) and Palestine (c. 363–c. 379).
Eunomius, bishop of Cyzicus (360–361) and exiled bishop (361–c. 393).
Paemenius, bishop of Constantinople, (c. 363, at the same time as Eudoxius of Antioch).
Candidus (Bishop of Lydia), (c. 363–?).
Arrianus, bishop of Ionia, (c. 363–?).
Florentius, bishop of Constantinople, (c. 363–?, at the same time as Eudoxius of Antioch).
Thallus, bishop of Lesbos, (c. 363–?, at the same time as Eudoxius of Antioch).
Euphronius, bishop of Galatia, the Black Sea and Cappadocia, (c. 363–?).
Julian, bishop of Cilicia, (c. 363–?).
Serras, Stephen, and Heliodorus, bishops of Egypt, (c. 363–?).
Philostorgius, historian.

Notable opponents of Anomoeanism
Basil of Caesarea, bishop of Caesarea, and author of Against Eunomius.
Gregory of Nazianzus, archbishop of Constantinople, prolific writer and orator.  The First Theological Oration. A Preliminary Discourse Against the Eunomians.
Gregory of Nyssa, bishop of the Cappadocian town of Nyssa and brother to Basil of Caesaria.  Against Eunomius (12 books) and Answer to Eunomius' Second Book.

See also
Archbishop Nectarius of Constantinople
Homoeans, in contrast to the Anomoeans
Arianism
Arian controversy

Notes

References
First edition Encyclopædia Britannica [issued 1768-1771]

Arianism
Trinitarianism
Christian terminology
Nature of Jesus Christ